The Laughing Lady is a 1929 sound film melodrama directed by Victor Schertzinger, starring Ruth Chatterton and produced and released by Paramount Famous Lasky Corporation. It is based on a 1922 British play, The Laughing Lady, by Alfred Sutro. The play was brought to New York in 1923 and put on Broadway starring Ethel Barrymore.

A 1924 Paramount silent film retitled A Society Scandal starred Gloria Swanson. It is now lost.

In 1930 a sound version, A Kacago Asszony, was produced by Paramount at its studio in Joinville, France, in Hungarian with a Hungarian director and cast.  It was released in the USA by Paramount in 1931.

Jeanne Eagels was to star in the film but died before production began.

Cast
Ruth Chatterton - Marjorie Lee
Clive Brook - Daniel Farr
Dan Healy - Al Brown
Nat Pendleton - James Dugan
Raymond Walburn - Hector Lee
Dorothy Hall - Flo
Nedda Harrigan - Cynthia Bell (*as Hedda Harrigan)
Lillian B. Tonge - Parker
Marguerite St. John - Mrs. Playgate
Hubert Druce - Hamilton Playgate
Alice Hegeman - Mrs. Collop
Joe King - City Editor
Helen Hawley - Rose

References

External links
The Laughing Lady at IMDb.com
The Laughing Lady at tcm.com

lantern slide(archived)

1929 films
American films based on plays
American drama films
Paramount Pictures films
Films directed by Victor Schertzinger
1929 drama films
American black-and-white films
Melodrama films
1920s English-language films
1920s American films